Little Salt Spring is an archaeological and paleontological site in North Port, Florida. The site has been owned by the University of Miami since 1980 with research performed there by the university's Rosenstiel School of Marine and Atmospheric Science. 

It is located directly off Price Boulevard between US 41 and Interstate 75 adjacent to Heron Creek Middle School in the North Port, Florida.

History
In 2013, the University of Miami began considering selling the site to Sarasota County, Florida, due to funding being cut towards maintaining the site and its facilities. On July 10, 1979, the site was added to the National Register of Historic Places. 

Little Salt Spring is a feature of the karst topography of Florida, specifically an example of a sinkhole. It is classified as a third magnitude spring. This fosters the preservation of Paleo-Indian and early Archaic artifacts and ecofacts, as well as fossil bones of the extinct megafauna once found in Florida.

Prehistoric human use
The water level in the spring has varied over time. Twelve to thirteen thousand years ago the ocean level was about 100 meters (more than 300 feet) lower than at present, drawing down the water table in Florida, and the water level in Little Salt Spring was  lower than at present. The basin around the spring and a slough extending away from it are filled with moist, soft peat. Hundreds of burials dating from 5,200 to 6,800 years ago have been found in the slough. As has happened in other wetland burials in Florida, such as at the Windover Archaeological Site, brain matter survived in many of the skulls. In the 1970s the overturned shell of an extinct giant land tortoise was found on the  ledge. A wooden stake had been driven between the carapace and the plastron, and there is evidence of a fire under the tortoise. It appears that the tortoise had been cooked in its shell. The radiocarbon date for the wooden stake was 12,030 years ago; a bone from the tortoise was dated to 13,450 years ago. Large numbers of human bones have been recovered from the spring itself, but were not collected under controlled conditions.

See also 
 List of sinkholes of the United States

References

External links
 Sarasota County listings at National Register of Historic Places
 Sarasota County listings at Florida's Office of Cultural and Historical Programs
 Little Salt Spring at the Marine Affairs and Policy Division of RSMAS

National Register of Historic Places in Sarasota County, Florida
University of Miami
Archaeological sites in Florida
Sinkholes of Florida
Bodies of water of Sarasota County, Florida
Archaeological sites on the National Register of Historic Places in Florida
Underwater archaeological sites
North Port, Florida